Arcus-Air GmbH & Co. KG is an airline.  Arcus Executive Aviation is based in Zweibrücken, Germany and Arcus Air Logistics in Troisdorf, Germany operating chartered cargo and corporate flights out of Mannheim City Airport.

History 

The airline was established in 1973. It offered scheduled passenger flights from Mannheim to Oberpfaffenhofen in the 1980s and to Leipzig and Dresden in the early 1990s, following the German Reunification. In 1997, Arcus-Air Logistic set up a subsidiary named Cosmos Air, which operated scheduled flights from Mannheim to Berlin and London, using the respective city-centre airports London City Airport and now-closed Tempelhof Airport, using Dornier 328 aircraft. In 1999, Cosmos Air was sold to Cirrus Airlines, bringing an end to scheduled flights operated by Arcus-Air Logistic.

On 18 June 2020 Arcus Air Logistic and Arcus Air OBC were acquired by Chapman Freeborn, a subsidiary of Avia Solutions Group. The two Dorniers will be owned by Chapman Freeborn but will be operated by the Arcus Air Group.

Fleet 
As of May 2022, the Arcus-Air fleet consists of the following aircraft:

References

External links

Official website

Airlines of Germany
Airlines established in 1973